The Black and White Club was an art association in New York. It held monthly exhibits by 1895.

Members included E. Irving Couse, Margaret Fernie Eaton, Hugh M. Eaton, Robert Bruce Horsfall, Walter Russell.

References

Arts organizations based in New York City
19th-century art groups
Art in New York City